A mold (American English), or mould (British and Commonwealth English), is a container used in various techniques of food preparation to shape the finished dish. The term may also refer to a finished dish made in said container (e.g. a jello mold).

Types
Molds can be used for a variety of foods:

 Cake molds (e.g. muffin tins, Bundt cake, angel food cake pans, and other types of bakeware)
 Springform pan
 Gelatin dessert molds (also known as "jelly molds")
 Ice cream and other frozen desserts
 Mousse
 Butter

See also

 List of cooking vessels
 List of food preparation utensils
 Bowl
 Molding (process)
 Pastry

References

Cooking vessels